Basia Wywerkówna (born July 4, 1928 in Warsaw, died April 17, 2008) was a Polish child actress. In 1935 she starred in the film ABC miłości.

References

Polish film actresses